Country calling code: +64
International call prefix: 00
Trunk prefix: 0

New Zealand's telephone numbering plan divides the country into a large number of local calling areas. When dialling, if you wish to call a person in another local calling area, you must dial the trunk prefix followed by the area code.

Below is a list of New Zealand local calling areas.

Area code 3

Area code 4

Area code 6

Area code 7

Area code 9

References

ITU allocations list

External links
 Official NZ Numbering Plan

New Zealand
Telecommunications in New Zealand